This is the full discography of American musician and record producer Brent Kutzle.

As performer

With OneRepublic 

Kutzle is a member of OneRepublic, an American band.

Albums 
 Dreaming Out Loud (2007)
 Waking Up (2009)
 Native (2013)

Singles 
 "Apologize"
 "Stop and Stare"
 "Say (All I Need)"
 "Mercy"
 "Come Home"
 "All the Right Moves"
 "Secrets"
 "Marchin On"
 "Good Life"
 "Christmas Without You"
 "Feel Again"
 "If I Lose Myself"
 "Counting Stars"
 "Something I Need"
 "Love Runs Out"
 "I Lived"

Songs written

Songs produced

References 

Production discographies
Pop music discographies
Discographies of American artists